Muhammad Khawja is a town and union council of Hangu District in Khyber Pakhtunkhwa province of Pakistan. It is located at 33°26'20N 70°54'34E and has an altitude of 928 metres (3047 feet).

References

Union councils of Hangu District
Populated places in Hangu District, Pakistan